Ludmila Viktorovna Engquist (née Leonova. formerly Narozhilenko; born 21 April 1964) is a Russian-Swedish former athlete, who competed mainly in the 100 metres hurdles. She competed for the Soviet Union (until 1991), Russia (from 1992) and Sweden (from 1996). She is the 1996 Olympic champion and the 1991 and 1997 World champion in the 100m hurdles. Her best time of 12.26 secs in 1992, ranks her fourth on the world all-time list. She is also a former world record holder in the 60 metres hurdles with 7.69 secs (1990).

Biography
Engquist was born in Tambov Oblast, Soviet Union. During her first marriage her name was Ludmila Narozhilenko, which was also her name while she competed for the  Soviet Union and Russia. She appeared for the Soviet Union at the 1988 Seoul Olympics, where she fell in her semifinal; and for the Unified Team at the 1992 Barcelona Olympics, where she was forced to withdraw from the semifinals due to injury.

In 1995, she married Swedish businessman Johan Engquist and in 1996 she became a Swedish citizen. She won gold medals in 100 m hurdles at the 1991 World Championships (for the Soviet Union) and 1997 World Championships as well as the 1996 Summer Olympics in Atlanta (both for Sweden). For her 1997 victory in Athens, Engquist received the Svenska Dagbladet Gold Medal, the first non-native Swede to win this award. During these years she became one of the most popular woman athletes of Sweden and was sometimes dubbed a role model for younger native Swedish talents.

In 1999 Engquist was diagnosed with breast cancer.  After surgery she stopped chemotherapy after 4 treatments because she did not want the drugs to interfere with her athletic career, and successfully returned to the track.

After a distinguished athletic career she retired from running but wanted to become the first woman ever to win gold medals at both the Summer and Winter Olympics, by competing in and winning the inaugural two-woman bobsleigh event at the 2002 Winter Olympics. In late 2001, however, she was found guilty of having recently used banned drugs and barred from competition for two years. Her admission of drug use, though only during the recent part of her bobsleigh effort, made her a very controversial person in Sweden and considering that she had tested positive for banned drugs once before, during her days as a Soviet runner, and had sustained a ban (which was appealed and lifted after a while) some alleged that she had been using performance-enhancing substances regularly all the time, a claim for which there is no evidence. The penalty term ended on 3 December 2003, but Engquist has not returned to competition since then.

She currently lives in Spain with her husband Johan Engquist.

References

External links
 
 
 
 Biography
 Over hurdles on to ice (News article in The Observer)
  Her Biggest Hurdle

1964 births
Living people
Soviet female hurdlers
Russian female hurdlers
Swedish female hurdlers
Athletes (track and field) at the 1988 Summer Olympics
Athletes (track and field) at the 1992 Summer Olympics
Athletes (track and field) at the 1996 Summer Olympics
Olympic athletes of the Soviet Union
Olympic athletes of the Unified Team
Olympic athletes of Sweden
Olympic gold medalists for Sweden
Doping cases in athletics
Doping cases in bobsleigh
Russian sportspeople in doping cases
Swedish sportspeople in doping cases
Russian emigrants to Sweden
Swedish people of Russian descent
Naturalized citizens of Sweden
World Athletics Championships medalists
Swedish female bobsledders
Medalists at the 1996 Summer Olympics
Olympic gold medalists in athletics (track and field)
Goodwill Games medalists in athletics
Soviet Athletics Championships winners
World Athletics Indoor Championships medalists
World Athletics Indoor Championships winners
World Athletics Championships winners
Competitors at the 1990 Goodwill Games
Sportspeople from Tambov Oblast